A dermatoxin (from derma, the Greek word for skin) is a toxic chemical that damages skin, mucous membranes, or both, often leading to tissue necrosis. Dermatoxins can be drugs, natural chemicals, or synthetic chemicals.

The severity of the effects of a dermatoxic agent is strongly dependent on the dose, route of exposure, rate at which it spreads, and the health of the afflicted individual.

Examples of dermatoxic substances
 T-2 toxin
 Sterigmatocystin
 Sulfur mustard
 Psoralen
 Cantharidin

See also
 Vesicant

References

External links
 

Dermatoxins